Henfold Lakes are a series of small lakes with adjoining trees and meadows, covering  of Surrey countryside. The lakes have been nurtured to be a prime habitat for carp, bream, crucian, roach and golden tench. The maximum depth is seven feet.

The site abuts Brook Copse on its north eastern corner and has fishing through five lakes, joined by weirs and an interconnecting stream, and a touring caravan site. Outdoor pursuits at Henfold Lakes include coarse fishing, barbecues, bonfires, camping, falconry and cycling stop-overs.

References

External links
Henfold Lakes Fishery and Caravan Park 
Henfold Lakes Falconry

Lakes of Surrey
Recreational fishing in England